Pedipes is a genus of small air-breathing snails, pulmonate gastropod mollusks in the subfamily Pedipedinae of the family Ellobiidae.

Species
 Pedipes affinis Férussac, 1821
 Pedipes amplicatus (Jickeli, 1874)
 Pedipes angulatus C. B. Adams, 1852
 Pedipes bodomoli Perugia, 2021
 Pedipes deschampsi Ancey, 1887
 Pedipes dohrni d'Ailly, 1896
 Pedipes jouani Montrouzier, 1862
 Pedipes leoniae Ancey, 1887
 Pedipes mirabilis (Megerle von Mühlfeld, 1816)
 † Pedipes mirandus J. Gibson-Smith & W. Gibson-Smith, 1985
 Pedipes moreleti (Pilsbry & Bequaert, 1927)
 Pedipes ovalis C. B. Adams, 1849
 Pedipes pedipes (Bruguière, 1789)
 Pedipes sandwicensis Pease, 1860
 Pedipes unisulcatus Cooper, 1866
Taxa inquirenda
 Pedipes biangulatus S. H. F. Jaeckel, 1927 (use in more recent taxonomic literature currently undocumented)
 Pedipes crassidens Bavay, 1920 (invalid: junior homonym of Pedipes crassidens Melleville, 1843)
 Pedipes globulosus C. B. Adams, 1845
 Pedipes liratulus Kobelt, 1901 
Species brought into synonymy
 Pedipes adansonii Blainville, 1824: synonym of Pedipes pedipes (Bruguière, 1789) 
 Pedipes afer (Gmelin, 1791): synonym of Pedipes pedipes (Bruguière, 1789)
 Pedipes afra (Gmelin, 1791): synonym of Pedipes pedipes (Bruguière, 1789) 
 Pedipes angulata C. B. Adams, 1852: synonym of Pedipes angulatus C. B. Adams, 1852 (wrong gender agreement of the specific epithet)
  † Pedipes crassidens Melleville, 1843: synonym of † Traliopsis crassidens (Melleville, 1843)  (new combination)
 Pedipes forestieri Souverbie & Montrouzier, 1864: synonym of Allochroa forestieri (Souverbie & Montrouzier, 1864) (original combination)
  † Pedipes glaber F. E. Edwards, 1852: synonym of † Marinula (Promarinula) glabra (F. E. Edwards, 1852): represented as  † Marinula glabra (F. E. Edwards, 1852)  (new combination)
 Pedipes granum (Morelet, 1872): synonym of Pedipes moreleti (Pilsbry & Bequaert, 1927) 
 Pedipes insularis F. Haas, 1950: synonym of Pedipes ovalis C. B. Adams, 1849
 † Pedipes lapparenti de Raincourt, 1884: synonym of † Marinula (Promarinula) lapparenti (de Raincourt, 1884): represented as † Marinula lapparenti (de Raincourt, 1884) (new combination)
 Pedipes lirata Binney, 1860: synonym of Pedipes angulatus C. B. Adams, 1852 (wrong gender agreement of specific epithet)
 Pedipes liratus Binney, 1860: synonym of Pedipes angulatus C. B. Adams, 1852
  † Pedipes lowii Deshayes, 1863: synonym of † Marinula (Promarinula) lowii (Deshayes, 1863) represented as † marinula lowii  (Deshayes, 1863) (new combination)
 † Pedipes marceauxi Deshayes, 1863: synonym of † Marinula (Promarinula) marceauxi (Deshayes, 1863) represented as Marinula marceauxi (Deshayes, 1863) † (new combination)
 Pedipes octanfracta Jonas, 1845: synonym of Laemodonta octanfracta (Jonas, 1845) (original combination)
 † Pedipes pfeifferi Deshayes, 1863: synonym of † Marinula (Promarinula) pfeifferi (Deshayes, 1863): represented as † Marinula pfeifferi (Deshayes, 1863) (new combination)
 Pedipes pietin Dautzenberg, 1910: synonym of Pedipes pedipes (Bruguière, 1789) 
 Pedipes quadridens L. Pfeiffer, 1839: synonym of Pedipes mirabilis (Megerle von Mühlfeld, 1816) (probable synonym; see Faber (2004))
 Pedipes unisulcata Cooper, 1866: synonym of Pedipes unisulcatus'' Cooper, 1866 (wrong gender agreement of specific epithet)

References

External links

 Férussac, A.E.J.P.F. d'Audebard de. (1821-1822). Tableaux systématiques des animaux mollusques classés en familles naturelles, dans lesquels on a établi la concordance de tous les systèmes; suivis d'un Prodrome général pour tous les mollusques ou fluviatiles, vivantes ou fossiles. Paris, 1821 et 1822.
 Gofas, S.; Le Renard, J.; Bouchet, P. (2001). Mollusca. in: Costello, M.J. et al. (eds), European Register of Marine Species: a check-list of the marine species in Europe and a bibliography of guides to their identification. Patrimoines Naturels. 50: 180-213
 Möllendorff, O. F. von. (1898). Verzeichnis der auf den Philippinen lebenden Landmollusken. Abhandlungen der Naturforschenden Gesellschaft zu Görlitz. 22: 26-208
  Clench, W. J. (1964). The genera Pedipes and Laemodonta in the Western Atlantic. Johnsonia. 4(42): 117-128

Ellobiidae